Zamkan-e Olya (also Romanized as Zamkān-e ‘Olyā; also known as Zamkānī) is a village in Zamkan Rural District, in the Zamkan District of Salas-e Babajani County, Kermanshah Province, Iran. At the 2006 census, its population was 561, in 103 families.

References 

Populated places in Salas-e Babajani County